Katghar Lalganj is a sub-district, town and a Nagar Panchayat in Azamgarh district in the Indian state of Uttar Pradesh.It comes under the Parliamentary Constituency - Lalganj (Lok Sabha constituency).

Demographics
 India census, Katghar Lalganj had a population of 581,647. Males constitute 280,992 and females 300,655. Katghar Lalganj has an average literacy rate of 59%, lower than the national average of 59.5%: male literacy is 66%, and female literacy is 51%. In Katghar Lalganj, 18% of the population is under 6 years of age.

The Lalganj is a tehsil headquarters. It is around 50 km from the Varanasi and situated in between Varanasi and Azamgarh Highway. Devgaon, just 4 km from the Lalganj is another place of major habitation. Other major places which fall under the tehsil are Gorhara, Khargipur, Bardah, Meh Nagar, Tarwa etc.

The main occupation of the people living in Lalganj Tehsil is agriculture. The area is blessed with fertile land with wheat and paddy as major food crop grown. Potato, maize, vegetable crops are some of the other crops of the area.

References

Cities and towns in Azamgarh district